Peter Head (born 18 February 1935) is a British former swimmer.

Swimming career
He competed in the men's 400 metre freestyle at the 1952 Summer Olympics. He also represented his country at Commonwealth Games and European Championships. His most successful performance in professional swimming came in Paris 1957, where he came second in both the 100m and 400m freestyle at the World University Games.

He represented England in the freestyle disciplines at the 1954 British Empire and Commonwealth Games in Vancouver, Canada.

In January 2016, Head was interviewed in the Swimming Times and appeared on the front page.

References

1935 births
Living people
British male swimmers
Olympic swimmers of Great Britain
Swimmers at the 1952 Summer Olympics
Place of birth missing (living people)
Swimmers at the 1954 British Empire and Commonwealth Games
Commonwealth Games competitors for England
20th-century British people